Shutter (Thai: ชัตเตอร์ กดติดวิญญาณ Chattoe: Kot Tit Winyan, "Shutter: Press to Capture Ghosts") is a 2004 Thai supernatural horror film by Banjong Pisanthanakun and Parkpoom Wongpoom; starring Ananda Everingham, Natthaweeranuch Thongmee, and Achita Sikamana. It focuses on mysterious images seen in developed pictures. The film was a huge box office success, making it one of the best known horror films from Thailand and recognized worldwide.

The film was remade in Telugu as Photo, in Tamil as Sivi, in English  under the same name and in Hindi as Click.

Plot
After a friends' party, Jane (Natthaweeranuch Thongmee) and her photographer boyfriend Tun (Ananda Everingham) get into a car accident, with Jane accidentally running over a woman. Tun prohibits her from getting out of the car; they drive away, leaving the girl on the road.

Tun begins to discover mysterious white shadows and faces in his photographs. Jane thinks these images may be the ghost of the girl they hit. Tun, who has been experiencing severe neck pains since the accident, visits a specialist and is dismayed to find that his weight is double his regular weight. He dismisses the idea of being haunted, though his friends are also being disturbed by this entity.

Jane discovers that the girl was Natre, a shy young woman who had attended the same college as Tun. Tun admits that he and Natre were in a relationship, which Tun had kept secret from his friends. Natre loved Tun and threatened to commit suicide when he broke off the relationship. Tun witnesses his friend, Tonn, committing suicide, and discovers that his two other close friends from college have also committed suicide. Believing that they have been coerced into doing so by Natre's ghost, Tun becomes convinced he will be next.

Tun and Jane visit Natre's mother and discover Natre's decaying body in the bedroom. Natre had committed suicide, but her mother could not bear to have her cremated. They convince her mother to have a proper funeral for her, after which Jane hopes that everything will return to normal. They spend the night at a hotel, where Tun is confronted by Natre's ghost. While trying to get away, he falls off a fire escape and is injured.

On returning to Bangkok, Jane collects some photographs. One of the films shows a series of images of Natre crawling towards the bookcase in Tun's apartment. Jane finds a set of negatives hidden behind the bookcase. She develops them to find photographs in which Tun's friends—the ones who committed suicide—are sexually assaulting Natre. Disgusted by her findings and now convinced that Natre tried to warn her, a teary Jane confronts Tun. Tun admits that he witnessed the rape but did nothing to stop his friends, and that he was the one who had taken those photos. He says he did it out of peer pressure and has never forgiven himself but Jane leaves him.

Knowing he is still haunted by Natre, Tun begins taking pictures of every room in the house, but does not see her. He throws the camera in a rage, only for it to go off and take a photograph of Tun, showing Natre sitting on his shoulders and revealing the true cause for his neck pain and double body weight. Natre covers his eyes, making him lose balance and fall out of the window.

The final scene shows Tun bandaged and slumped over, sitting on a hospital bed while Jane visits him. As the door swings closed, the glass reflection shows Natre still sitting on his shoulders.

Cast
Ananda Everingham as Tun
Natthaweeranuch Thongmee as Jane
Achita Sikamana as Natre

Reception

Critical response

Public response
The film opened at #1 at the Thai box office grossing $867,800 and remained at the top in its second weekend grossing $607,300. The film grossed a total of $2,584,600 in Thailand becoming the fifth-highest-grossing film of the year.

The film was nominated for the 2005 Golden Kinnaree Award for best film at the Bangkok International Film Festival and has won various awards at smaller festivals around the world. The movie was especially well received in Thailand and Singapore.

Remakes
The film was remade in Telugu as Photo (2006), in Tamil as Sivi (2007), in Hollywood as Shutter (2008) and in Hindi as Click (2010).

See also
List of ghost films

References

External links
 
 

2004 films
Films directed by Banjong Pisanthanakun
Films based on urban legends
2000s ghost films
2004 horror films
Thai ghost films
Thai-language films
2000s supernatural horror films
Thai supernatural horror films
GMM Tai Hub films
Rape and revenge films
Fiction about photography
Films about photographers
Films about road accidents and incidents
Thai national heritage films
Thai films remade in other languages